Pervomaysky is a rural locality (a settlement) in Obozerskoye Rural Settlement of Plesetsky District, Arkhangelsk Oblast, Russia. The population was 123 as of 2010.

Geography 
Pervomaysky is located 139 km north of Plesetsk (the district's administrative centre) by road. Bolshaya Kyama is the nearest rural locality.

References 

Rural localities in Plesetsky District